The 2023 Ohio State Buckeyes football team will represent the Ohio State University as a member of the East Division of the Big Ten Conference during the 2023 NCAA Division I FBS football season. The team is expected to be led by Ryan Day in his fifth season as Ohio State's head coach. The Buckeyes play their home games at Ohio Stadium in Columbus, Ohio. It will be the Buckeyes' 134th season overall and 111th as a member of the Big Ten.

Previous season
The Buckeyes finished the 2022 season 11–2, 8–1 in Big Ten play to finish second place in the East Division. Despite losing to Michigan at home for the first time since 2000 and failing to reach the Big Ten Championship for the second consecutive season, the Buckeyes received the fourth seed in the College Football Playoff. They faced No. 1 Georgia in the Peach Bowl, where they lost, 41–42, after a potential game winning field goal at the stroke of midnight 2023.

Offseason

Coaching staff changes

Coaching staff departures

Transfers

Transfers out
The Buckeyes lost 9 players to the transfer portal.

Transfers in
The Buckeyes added six players via transfer.

Preseason

Spring Game
The 2023 Spring Game will be held at Ohio Stadium on Saturday, April 15, 2023.

Schedule

Game summaries

at Indiana

vs Youngstown State (FCS)

vs Western Kentucky

at Notre Dame

vs Maryland

at Purdue

vs Penn State (rivalry)

at Wisconsin

at Rutgers

vs Michigan State

vs Minnesota

at Michigan (The Game)

Roster

Staff

References

Ohio State
Ohio State Buckeyes football seasons
Ohio State Buckeyes football